Muḥammad al-Qāʾim (or al-Ḳāʾim) may refer to:

Hujjat Allah al-Mahdi (b. c. 870), the twelfth imam according Twelver Shia Islam
Abu Abdallah al-Qaim, Saadi ruler of Morocco from 1510 to 1517